Remuera Library is a local branch of Auckland Libraries, serving the suburb of Remuera. It is housed in a historic building, which is considered to be a landmark in the area.

History
In 1915, a branch library was established for Remuera. It was originally located in the brick shops located at 411–413 Remuera Road. The building had previously belonged to the Remuera Road Board, which amalgamated with the Auckland City Council in the same year. In 1926, parts of this building were taken to Point Chevalier and used to construct the public library there.

On 31 July 1926, the Remuera Library was opened on its present site. The building was designed by the architectural firm Gummer and Ford, who were then one of the leading firms in Auckland. The building shows influences of Neo-Georgian and Arts and Crafts style architecture, stemming from Gummer's study in England under Edwin Lutyens. It has a largely open plan design, which was innovative at the time. The building won a NZIA gold medal for its design in 1928.

The building features a large lecture hall which had previously been used to deliver public lectures. At some point in the mid-twentieth century, Auckland Libraries ceased their public lecture series (largely due to declining interest) and the lecture hall was converted to accommodate the library's growing collection. There is an entrance to the library through the lecture hall which remained closed for much of its existence. There were various additions made to the library during the late 1950s and early 1960s, including the building of partitioning walls.

A major heritage restoration project was undertaken in 2002. This restoration undid many of the additions that had been made during the 1950s and 1960s. A disabilities ramp was installed leading to Saint Vincent Avenue and the lecture hall entrance to the library was finally re-opened. The staff workroom was also expanded, utilising the former stage as floorspace. These renovations led to the library winning another NZIA medal in 2004 in the Heritage and Conservation category.  

In 2006, there was some debate about the gnomon on the sundial installed outside the library being set in the wrong direction, and therefore not working.

References

External links
 New Zealand Historical Places Trust Entry

1915 establishments in New Zealand
Libraries in Auckland
Heritage New Zealand Category 1 historic places in the Auckland Region
1910s architecture in New Zealand